Texas Fever is a 1984 EP released by the Scottish post-punk band Orange Juice. The mini-album was re-issued on CD in 1998 and again in 2014.

Track listing
All tracks composed by Edwyn Collins; except where indicated
 "Bridge" – 3:38
 "Craziest Feeling" (Edwyn Collins, Frank Want) – 3:02
 "Punch Drunk" (Malcolm Ross) – 3:34
 "The Day I Went Down to Texas" – 2:42
 "A Place in My Heart" – 3:01
 "A Sad Lament" – 4:43

CD Re-Issue Bonus Tracks

  "Leaner Period"
  "Out For the Count"
  "Move Yourself"

Personnel
Orange Juice
 Edwyn Collins  – guitar, vocals, songwriting
 Malcolm Ross – guitar, vocals, keyboards, songwriting
 David McClymont – bass guitar, keyboards
 Zeke Manyika – drums, vocals, percussion, songwriting
Technical
Will Gosling - engineer
Robert Sharp - sleeve photography

References

1984 albums
Orange Juice (band) albums
Polydor Records albums